Alan Francis Clutton-Brock (8 October 1904 – 18 December 1976) was an English art critic and essayist.

Clutton-Brock was born in Weybridge, Surrey, the son of Arthur Clutton-Brock. He was educated at Eton and King's College, Cambridge.

He was art critic of The Times, 1945–55, a trustee of the National Gallery, and Slade Professor of Fine Art, at Cambridge, 1955–58. He wrote books of art criticism, a biography of William Blake, and a detective story, Murder at Liberty Hall. During the Second World War he served in the Royal Air Force Volunteer Reserve.

Clutton-Brock was twice married. His first wife, Shelagh, née Archer, with whom he had a daughter (Juliet Clutton-Brock) and a son, died in a road accident in 1936. In the same year he married Barbara Foy Mitchell, with whom he had a daughter. He died at his home, Chastleton House, Oxfordshire, aged 72.

References

External links
 

1904 births
1976 deaths
People educated at Eton College
Alumni of King's College, Cambridge
English art critics
Royal Air Force Volunteer Reserve personnel of World War II